The Asian and Oceanian Zone is one of the three zones of regional Davis Cup competition in 2010.

In the Asian and Oceanian Zone there are four different groups in which teams compete against each other to advance to the next group.

Format

There will be a Round Robin with eight teams. The eight nations will be divided into two pools of four. The top two teams in each pool will advance to the Final Pool of four teams from which the two highest-placed nations are promoted to Asia and Oceania Group II in 2010. The bottom two teams of each pool of the Round Robin will compete against each other in the Relegation Pool. The two lowest-placed nations are relegated to Asia and Oceania Group IV in 2010.

Information

Venue: Enghelab Sports Complex, Tehran, Iran

Surface: clay – outdoors

Dates: 28 April – 2 May

Participating teams

 
 
 
 
  – Withdrew

Pool A

Matches

Iran vs. Syria

Syria vs. Kuwait

Iran vs. Kuwait

Pool B

Matches

Bangladesh vs. Oman

Lebanon vs. Vietnam

Lebanon vs. Oman

Bangladesh vs. Vietnam

Vietnam vs. Oman

Bangladesh vs. Lebanon

Promotion Pool

 Syria and Iran promoted to Group II in 2011.

Matches

Iran vs. Lebanon

Vietnam vs. Syria

Syria vs. Lebanon

Iran vs. Vietnam

Relegation Pool

 Bangladesh (and Saudi Arabia) relegated to Group IV in 2011.

Matches

Kuwait vs. Bangladesh

Kuwait vs. Oman

External links
Davis Cup draw details

Asia Oceania Zone Group III
Davis Cup Asia/Oceania Zone